Dru Brown is an Australian filmmaker. He produced and directed The Suicide Theory (2014). He was born in Canberra and is of Aboriginal descent from Ngiyampaa people.

Films
The Suicide Theory, in which he served as producer and director, won the Grand Jury Prize at the L.A film festival, Dances With Films in 2014. Becoming the first international film to do so in the 17 year history of the festival. It also played opening night at the 2014 Austin Film Festival, winning the Dark Matters Audience Award. It had a 10 city U.S theatrical release in 2015 and was named #5 in The Guardian'''s: 10 Best Aussie Films of 2015. It also won 3 awards at the 2014 Melbourne Underground Film Festival (Including the Jury Prize).Double or Nothing'' was announced in 2021 starring John Jarratt, Rowan Howard, Andrew Ian Pope, Vince Colosimo, Robert Rabiah and Steve Mouzakis. Brown serves as writer and director.

References 

Australian film directors
Australian film producers
Year of birth missing (living people)
Living people